The Secret Life of Kathy McCormick is a 1988 American made-for-television romantic comedy film starring Barbara Eden, Josh Taylor, Judy Geeson, Jenny O'Hara and Dick O'Neill. It was broadcast on NBC on October 7, 1988.

The film's tagline in newspaper and magazine ads was: A modern-day Cinderella has an absolute ball with high society!

Plot summary
A modern-day Cinderella tale about a grocery-store cashier named Kathy McCormick (Barbara Eden) who becomes a member of local high society through a series of misunderstandings and when she tells her society peers she works at The Market, they believe she's talking about the stock market. While attending a charity luncheon, she meets and falls in love with Grant Sherwood (Josh Taylor), a wealthy playboy who is unaware of her true identity.

Cast
 Barbara Eden as Kathy McCormick
 Josh Taylor as Grant Sherwood
 Judith-Marie Bergan as Janice
 Judy Geeson as Babs
 Jenny O'Hara as Lisa
 Robert Costanzo as Sid
 Jennifer Savidge as Marsha
 Dick O'Neill as Ray

Home media
The Secret Life of Kathy McCormick was released on VHS on December 10, 1993.

References

External links

1988 films
1988 television films
1988 romantic comedy films
American romantic comedy films
Films scored by Mark Snow
NBC network original films
1980s English-language films
1980s American films